The title of the Hero of the Czechoslovak Republic was established 1955. The name of the title was changed to Hero of the Czechoslovak Socialist Republic in 1960. Awarded 31 times to some Czechoslovak war heroes, to the general and later president Ludvík Svoboda, to the Czechoslovak president Gustáv Husák, to the Czech cosmonaut Vladimír Remek, Soviet generals and marshals and to Leonid Brezhnev. The piece no. 32 has been given to the National Museum.

The title Hero of CSR (later Hero of CSSR) was awarded to honor extraordinary merits for the republic connected with a hero achievement or repeated achievements. The title was awarded upon proposal of the government. The hero was awarded with Order of Klement Gottwald - for building of Socialist Homeland. 

The Gold Star of the Hero of CSSR was worn on the left breast side above all the Czechoslovak Awards or their ribbons, always in natura and in front of the Gold Star of the Hero of the Socialist Labour.

Recipients
Josef Frank
Gustáv Husák (3 times)
Ludvík Svoboda (3 times)
Vladimír Remek
Jan Šverma
Vendelín Opatrný
Karol Šmidke
Vladimír Clementis
Leonid Iljich Brezhnev (3 times)
Ivan Stepanovich Konev
Karel Klapálek
Andrei Antonovich Grechko
Ivan Ignatevich Jakubovski
Dmitriy Fjodorovich Ustinov
Matvej Vasiljevich Zacharov
Jurij Viktorovich Romanenko
Georgi Michajlovich Grechko
Alexei Alexandrovich Gubarev
Kiril Semjonovich Moskalenko
Andrey Yeryomenko
Dmitriy Danilovich Leljusenko

External links
 Gold Star of the Hero of Czechoslovak Socialist Republic (in  Czech with pictures)

Military awards and decorations of Czechoslovakia
Civil awards and decorations of Czechoslovakia
Awards established in 1955
Awards disestablished in 1983
1955 establishments in Czechoslovakia
1983 disestablishments in Czechoslovakia
Hero (title)